Russell Blake may refer to:
 Russell Blake (footballer)
 Russell Blake (author)

See also
 Blake Russell, American long-distance runner